Balderdash is a board game.

Balderdash may also refer to:

 Balderdash (game show), a television show based on the game
 "Balderdash", a 2007 single by Ipso Facto (band)
 Balderdash, nickname of Adam Balding, an English rugby union footballer

See also
 Ganser syndrome, also called balderdash syndrome, a rare mental disorder
 Balderdash and Piffle, a radio show regarding English words